Egghead is an anti-intellectual epithet.

Egghead may also refer to:

Fictional characters
"Egghead", the nickname of Sonic's nemesis, Doctor Eggman
Egghead (DC Comics)
Egghead (Marvel Comics)
Egghead (Looney Tunes)
Egghead Jr., a Looney Tunes character

Television
Eggheads (TV series), a British quiz show
"Eggheads", the eighth Sonic Boom episode
"Eggheads" (Sliders), an episode of the TV show Sliders

Other
Manolo the Egghead, a famous series of prank phone calls
Egghead Software, a technology company based in Bellevue WA, USA
Egghead: Or, You Can't Survive on Ideas Alone, a poetry book by Bo Burnham
Eggheads, a series of public art sculptures by Robert Arneson